Copley High School is a public high school in Copley Township, just west of Akron, Ohio, United States.  It is the only high school in the Copley–Fairlawn City School District and competes athletically in the American Division of the Suburban League. The school's colors are blue and gold.  The fight song is Ohio State's "Across the Field". The school's main rival is Revere High School, with whom they play against annually for the a trophy called "The Bell" during the 5th game of their football season.

State championships

 Boys golf – 2003
 Boys soccer – 1994
 Boys Cross Country – 2015
 Girls soccer – 2022

Notable alumni

 Delone Carter, professional football player in the National Football League (NFL)
 Carrie Coon, Broadway, film, and television actress
 Jeff Golub, guitarist, played jazz, rock, blues, and smooth jazz.
 Riley Grant, professional soccer player in United League Soccer
 Denise Johns, professional beach volleyball player
 Jeff Tabaka, professional baseball player in Major League Baseball 
 Josh Williams, a professional soccer player in Major League Soccer

References

External links
 

High schools in Summit County, Ohio
Public high schools in Ohio